Myron resetari, also known as the Broome mangrove snake or Resetar's mangrove snake, is a species of venomous homalopsid snake native to the marine waters of north-western Australia. The specific epithet resetari honours herpetologist Alan Resetar of the Field Museum of Natural History.

Description
The snake grows to an average of about 40 cm in length.

Behaviour
The species is viviparous.

Distribution and habitat
The species is known only from the type locality of Broome, in tropical north-western Western Australia, where it inhabits mangrove-lined coastal waters.

References

resetari
Snakes of Australia
Reptiles of Western Australia
Reptiles described in 2011